Muldon is an unincorporated community in Monroe County, Mississippi.

According to the United States Geological Survey, variant names are Aberdeen Junction, Loohattan, Loohatten and Louhatten.

References

Unincorporated communities in Monroe County, Mississippi
Unincorporated communities in Mississippi